Harry P. Guy (1870 – September 16, 1950) was an American ragtime composer.

Guy was born in Zanesville, Ohio, where he wrote his first compositions. He then moved to New York, where he studied under Victor Herbert and started his career writing musical arrangements. He later moved to Detroit in 1895, where he worked first for Whitney-Warner and then Willard Bryant, writing songs for many famous artists of the era.  He also composed arrangements for the University of Michigan and University of Detroit. His 1898 song, Echos from the Snowball Club, has become a ragtime classic. Later in life, he fell into obscurity, living alone in poverty until he died on September 16, 1950. He was buried at Elmwood Cemetery in Detroit, in an unmarked grave until a group of local enthusiasts and citizens held a ceremony and placed a marker in 2003.

List of compositions

The Floweret (1887)
My Wooing (1888)
When the Dew Begems the Lea (1889)
Echoes from the Snowball Club (1898)
Now For a Stranger Don't Cast Me Aside (1898)
Cleanin' Up in Georgia (1899)
Belle of the Creoles (1899)
Pearl of the Harem (1901)
Pepper Pot Rag (1901)
Daughters of Dahomey (1902)
Song of the Western Hunter (1902)
Down in Mobile (1904)
Walkin' and Talkin''' (1906)Sixty-Six (1907)As Long As There Is Love (I Will Love You) (with Eddie McGrath) (1914)Love's Eternity (1915)We'll Stand Our Flag and the United States (1917)Yankee's Doodle In the Flight To Stay (1918)You and I (1921)That Home In Paradise (Love and Home Forever) (1921)Big Hearted Baby'' (with Raymond B. Egan) (1928)

References

External links
 

Burials at Elmwood Cemetery (Detroit)
Ragtime composers
Musicians from Detroit
People from Zanesville, Ohio
1870 births
1950 deaths